Vangelis Pitkas (born 30 July 1983) is a Greek professional footballer who plays as a goalkeeper for Super League 2 club Apollon Pontus.

Career
Born in Serres, Pitkas began playing football in the Delta Ethniki with Nea Kallikratia. He would play in the third level of Greek football with Aiolikos before joining second level Anagennisi Karditsa.

On 31 August 2019 it was confirmed that Pitkas had joined Rodos.

Personal life

Pitkas hails from Karperi, Serres.

References

External links
Scoresway Profile
Myplayer.gr Profile
Profile at Onsports.gr

1983 births
Living people
Greek footballers
Association football goalkeepers
Delta Ethniki players
Gamma Ethniki players
Football League (Greece) players
Super League Greece players
Super League Greece 2 players
Iraklis Thessaloniki F.C. players
Aiolikos F.C. players
Tilikratis F.C. players
Panachaiki F.C. players
Paniliakos F.C. players
Apollon Smyrnis F.C. players
Panegialios F.C. players
PAS Lamia 1964 players
Doxa Drama F.C. players
Volos N.F.C. players
Rodos F.C. players
Apollon Pontou FC players
Footballers from Serres